A Fair to Remember may refer to:
 A Fair to Remember (film)
 A Fair to Remember (Modern Family)

See also
 A Faire to Remember, a 2001 album by Brobdingnagian Bards
 An Affair to Remember, a 1957 American romance film